Brissopsis bengalensis is a species of sea urchins of the family Brissidae. Their armour is covered with spines. Brissopsis bengalensis was first scientifically described in 1914 by Koehler.

References

Animals described in 1914
bengalensis